Kord-e Nabard is a village in Gol Khandan Rural District, in the Bumehen District of Pardis County, Tehran Province, Iran. At the 2006 census, its population was 86, in 22 families.

References 

Populated places in Pardis County